Maoricrypta is a genus of small to medium-sized sea snails, marine gastropod molluscs in the family Calyptraeidae, the slipper snails, cup and saucer shells and Chinese hat shells.

This marine genus is known to occur off New Zealand and Australia.

Species
Species within the genus Maoricrypta include:
 Maoricrypta costata (G.B. Sowerby I, 1824)
 † Maoricrypta haliotoidea Marwick, 1926 
 Maoricrypta immersa (Angas, 1865)
 Maoricrypta kopua Marshall, 2003
 Maoricrypta monoxyla (Lesson, 1831)
 † Maoricrypta profunda Hutton
 † Maoricrypta radiata (Hutton, 1873) 
 Maoricrypta sodalis B. A. Marshall, 2003
 Maoricrypta youngi Powell, 1940

References

 Marshall B.A. 2003. A review of the Recent and Late Cenozoic Calyptraeidae of New Zealand (Mollusca: Gastropoda). The Veliger 46(2): 117-144

Calyptraeidae
Taxa named by Harold John Finlay